Mezősas is a village in Hajdú-Bihar county, in the Northern Great Plain region of eastern Hungary.

Geography
Mezősas is located 50 kilometers away from the city of Debrecen, and is located within Hajdú-Bihar county. Like most major villages in Hungary, Mezősas is accessible by road. The village has a population estimate of 595 as of the first of January, 2011. The last actual head count was in 2015, when the population totaled 665, down from the 779 people residing there in 1990.

References

http://www.mezosas.atw.hu/ 
http://www.citypopulation.de/php/hungary-hajdubihar.php?cityid=18847

Populated places in Hajdú-Bihar County